NESCO or Nesco may refer to:

Organizations
 National Electric Signaling Company, United States
 National Enameling and Stamping Company, United States
 North Eastern Electric Supply Company (NESCo), England
 Northern Electricity Supply Company Limited, Bangladesh
 Nuclear Employee Sports and Cultural Organisation of Kalpakkam, a township in India
 The National Energy Services Company, Saudi Arabia

Places
 Nesco, New Jersey
 Northeast Story County, Colo, Iowa, see Colo–NESCO Community School District

Other
 A brand name of Metal Ware Corporation
 Navy Expeditionary Supply Corps Officer

See also
 NASCO (disambiguation)
 UNESCO